Chase Winovich (born April 19, 1995) is an American football defensive end for the Houston Texans of the National Football League (NFL). He played college football at Michigan. As a junior, he was a 2017 first-team (media) and second-team (coaches) All-Big Ten selection. As a senior, he was first-team All-Big Ten (both coaches and media) and received several second-team All-American recognition. He played outside linebacker and tight end at Michigan before switching to defensive end as a junior. He was drafted by the New England Patriots in the third round of the 2019 NFL Draft.

Early years
Winovich played linebacker and quarterback at Thomas Jefferson High School in Pennsylvania, where he committed to Michigan over offers from Arizona, Arkansas, Florida State, Michigan State, Missouri, Northwestern, Ohio State, Pitt, Tennessee, Virginia Tech, and West Virginia. At times he also played safety and return specialist. Despite being a lifelong Ohio State fan and having an offer from Ohio State, he committed to Michigan due to his connection to Michigan head coach Brady Hoke. Winovich's brother-in-law was also a huge Michigan fan. On National Signing Day, February 5, 2014, Winovich was the first to submit his National Letter of Intent paperwork, which was officially processed at 7:03 a.m., to Michigan.

College career

2014–2016 seasons
Winovich began his Michigan career as a freshman linebacker, switched to tight end as a sophomore (for new coach Jim Harbaugh) before settling at defensive end in 2016. He wore number 59 as a linebacker and 44 as a tight end (he also practiced at fullback). He did not appear in any games for the 2014 Michigan Wolverines, appeared in 6 for the 2015 Wolverines and appeared in 13, starting 2 at defensive end for the 2016 Wolverines.

2017 season
In the spring and summer of 2017, Winovich took ballet lessons in order to improve his ability to shift his weight and control his body. He also studied Ju-jitsu in the summer to improve his agility. On September 23, 2017, Winovich had 4 tackles for a loss, including 3 quarterback sacks against 2017 Purdue Boilermakers football team, earning Co-Big Ten Defensive Player of the Week. The performance also earned him recognition as the Walter Camp National Defensive Player of the Week (Michigan's 7th such honoree since 2014 and 3rd on defense). During the 2017 season, Winovich set a career high in tackles with 74. Winovich's 17.0 tackles for loss leads Michigan and the Big Ten and ranks tied for 11th in a single season in program history, while his 8.0 sacks are tied for most in the league. Following his redshirt junior season, Winovich earned 2017 All-Big Ten team recognition from the media (first-team) and coaches (second-team). On January 3, 2018 it was announced that Winovich would return for a fifth year at Michigan.

2018 season
On October 1, 2018, Winovich earned his second Big Ten Defensive Player of the Week recognition after recording 8 solo tackles and a sack to help Michigan overcome a 17-point deficit against Northwestern. Winovich referred to the Wolverines' 62-39 loss to Ohio State as "a mirage." During the 2018 season, Winovich recorded 62 tackles to rank third among Wolverines and first among defensive linemen, and 14.5 tackles for loss to lead the team. Winovich went 0-4 against Ohio State during his career. Following the season, he was named to the 2018 All-Big Ten defensive first-team by both the coaches and media. Winovich earned 2018 College Football All-America Team second-team recognition by the Walter Camp Football Foundation, American Football Coaches Association and College Football News. He earned third-team recognition from the Associated Press.

College statistics

Professional career

New England Patriots

2019
Winovich was selected by the New England Patriots in the third round (77th overall) of the 2019 NFL Draft. In June 2019 he signed a four-year deal worth $3.83 million, with a signing bonus of $997,312.

In Week 2 against the Miami Dolphins, Winovich recorded 1.5 sacks as the Patriots won 43–0. For his efforts in that game, he was named Pepsi NFL Rookie of the Week. In Week 5 against the Washington Redskins, Winovich sacked Colt McCoy once in the 33–7 win. The following week against the New York Giants, he recovered and returned a blocked punt for a touchdown, the first of his career.

2020
In Week 3 against the Las Vegas Raiders, Winovich recorded his first full sack of the season, a strip sack on Derek Carr which was recovered by the Patriots, during the 36–20 win. Against the Kansas City Chiefs, he recorded another sack, although a number of analysts cited a blown call from the referees negating a turnover. Winovich recorded his first career interception off a pass thrown by Justin Herbert in a Week 13 matchup against the Los Angeles Chargers during the Patriots’ 45-0 shutout. 
In Week 17 against the New York Jets, Winovich recorded a team high two sacks on Sam Darnold during the 28–14 win.

2021
On October 19, 2021, Winovich was placed on injured reserve. He was activated on November 17.

Cleveland Browns

On March 16, 2022, Winovich was traded to the Cleveland Browns in exchange for Mack Wilson. He was placed on injured reserve on September 20, 2022. He was activated on November 19.

Houston Texans
On March 17, 2023, Winovich signed a one-year contract with the Houston Texans.

NFL career statistics

Personal life 

Winovich's grandparents moved from Serbia to the United States and changed their last name, Vujinovic (“wolf-like” [Serbian Cyrillic: Вујиновић]) to Winovich. Winovich spends his offseasons in Portsmouth, New Hampshire.

Philanthropic work 
Winovich works with Tammi Carr and The ChadTough Foundation to raise awareness of and money for research on diffuse intrinsic pontine glioma (DIPG), an inoperable malignant tumor of the brainstem. (Carr's son, Chad, the grandson of former Michigan head football coach Lloyd Carr, died of DIPG in November 2015 at age 5.)

Since teaming up with The ChadTough Foundation prior to the 2017 Michigan football season, Winovich has worked to increase awareness about DIPG. In December 2017, Winovich and several of his teammates and coaches dyed their hair orange for the 2018 Outback Bowl in order to raise over $200,000 for the ChadTough Foundation. He has also participated in Dancing with the Michigan Stars, which raised over $143,000.

References

External links

 Michigan Wolverines bio

1995 births
Living people
People from Jefferson Hills, Pennsylvania
Sportspeople from the Pittsburgh metropolitan area
Players of American football from Pennsylvania
American football defensive linemen
Michigan Wolverines football players
New England Patriots players
Houston Texans players
Cleveland Browns players
American people of Serbian descent